The  is the agency for conducting prosecution in Japan. It consists of four tiers of offices: the Supreme Public Prosecutors Office; the High Public Prosecutors Offices (8), the District Public Prosecutors Offices (50); and the Local Public Prosecutors Offices (438).

History 

In 1872, Japan introduced a modern prosecution system following the French system. The 1880 Act provided that public prosecutors had exclusive power of prosecution and it was enforced in 1882. However, the then system adopted preliminary hearings and collection of evidence was placed on pretrial judges. The prosecution department was attached to the courts in 1890.

After the World War II, Japan enacted the new Constitution in 1946, which stipulates the principle of separation of powers, and thus, the prosecution department needed to be separated from the courts. The , which established the current prosecution organisations, was enforced on the same day as the new Constitution, 3 May 1947.

People

Prosecutors 
It lays down five ranks of public prosecutors: the Prosecutor-General, the Deputy Prosecutor-General, the Superintending Prosecutors, Public Prosecutors and Assistant Prosecutors.

The prosecutors' independence and impartiality are protected by law with some exceptions under Article 25 of the PPO, such as retirement age, physical/mental disability or supernumerary officials.

Prosecutor-General, Deputy Prosecutor-General and Superintending Prosecutors 
The  heads the Supreme Public Prosecutors Office. The  belongs to the Supreme Public Prosecutors Office and assists the Prosecutor-General. The Prosecutor-General supervises all the staff of the Public Prosecutors Office. Although the Minister of Justice may give general directions on criminal investigation and trial to prosecutors, the Minister can direct only the Prosecutor-General regarding a specific case.

The  head the High Public Prosecutors Offices and supervise the staff within the jurisdiction.

The appointment and removal of these offices (10 prosecutors) are decided by the Cabinet and attested by the Emperor.

The retirement age of the Prosecutor-General is 65, while that of all the other prosecutors is 63, including the Deputy Prosecutor-General and the Superintending Prosecutors.

Public Prosecutors 
 are assigned to one of the Public Prosecutors Offices and engaged in prosecution. They have the power to investigate any crimes, as well as issue orders to the police about specific investigations. Also, they have the authority to prosecute criminal cases. The Japanese law allows a public prosecutor not to prosecute a suspect when the prosecution is unnecessary due to the circumstances such as his/her age or the gravity of the offence. A suspect will be prosecuted if and only if it is obvious based on evidence that he/she has committed a crime in question and the prosecutor finds it necessary to prosecute him/her.

, 1,788 Public Prosecutors work for the Public Prosecutors Office, while 153 are posted to other ministries or agencies.

Each District Public Prosecutors Office is headed by a  assigned among experienced Public Prosecutors.

Assistant Prosecutors 
 are assigned to one of the Local Public Prosecutors Offices. They have the same authority to investigate and prosecute crimes as Public Prosecutors, though they usually deal with less serious cases.

Assistant Prosecutors are appointed from those who were particular public officials such as prosecutors' assistant officers and police officers and have passed the exam to become assistant prosecutors. , 770 Assistant Prosecutors work for the Public Prosecutors Office.

Assistant Officers 
There are more than 9,000  in the Public Prosecutors Office. They assist public prosecutors in conducting investigations and trials, and also carry out investigations themselves under public prosecutors' direction. They assume a wide-ranging role in the Public Prosecutors Office, including work related to prosecution, such as safekeeping of evidence, and general affairs, such as accounts.

Organisation

Supreme Public Prosecutors Office 
The  is located in Tokyo. It is the counterpart of the Supreme Court. It deals with criminal cases in which the High Courts' judgements have been appealed to the Supreme Court.

Location 
 1-1-1, Kasumigaseki, Chiyoda, Tokyo

Structure
The SPPO is structured as of 2021:

 Secretariat
 General Affairs Department
 Inspection and Guidance Department 	
 Criminal Affairs Department
 Public Security Department
 Trial Department

Executives 
, executives of the Supreme Public Prosecutors Office are as follows:

High Public Prosecutors Offices 

The  are located in 8 major cities in Japan: Tokyo, Osaka, Nagoya, Hiroshima, Fukuoka, Sendai, Sapporo and Takamatsu. Some of the High Public Prosecutors Offices have their branches. These locations correspond to those of the High Courts and their branches.

The High Public Prosecutors Offices deal with criminal cases appealed to the High Courts. In addition, the Tokyo High Public Prosecutors Office is responsible for the detention of a fugitive for the purpose of extradition upon a request from a foreign country.

District Public Prosecutors Offices 

The  are located in all the prefectural capitals (47) and 3 large cities in Hokkaido besides Sapporo. Most of them have their branches. These locations correspond to those of the District and the Family Courts and their branches.

Public prosecutors in the District Public Prosecutors Offices carry out investigations and trials of criminal cases. Most cases are referred to prosecutors by the police and other organisations such as customs, but some serious and complex cases are investigated by public prosecutors on their own.

Local Public Prosecutors Offices 
The  deal with criminal investigations and trials of less serious offences. There are 438 offices throughout the country. Their locations correspond to those of the Local Courts.

See also 
 Law of Japan
 Judicial system of Japan
 Criminal justice system of Japan
 Lay judges in Japan
 Attorneys in Japan

References

External links 
  
  
  

Government agencies of Japan
Extraordinary organs (Japan)
1947 establishments in Japan
Prosecution